Yauheni is a masculine Belarusian given name, a cognate of Eugene in English and Yevgeni in Russian. Notable people with the name include:

Yauheni Akhramenka (born 1995), Belarusian cyclist
Yauheni Hutarovich (born 1983), Belarusian cyclist
Yauheni Karaliok (born 1996), Belarusian cyclist
Yauheni Karaliou (born 1991), Belarusian diver
Yauheni Novikau (born 1996), Belarusian acrobatic gymnast
Yauheni Shamsonau (born 1991), Belarusian cyclist
Yauheni Yakauchuk (born 1986), Belarusian badminton player
Yauheni Zharnasek (born 1987), Belarusian weightlifter

Belarusian masculine given names